Geghanist may refer to:
 Geghanist, Ararat, Armenia
 Geghanist, Shirak, Armenia